Bixzunavirus (synonyms: I3-likeviruses and I3likevirus) is a genus of viruses in the order Caudovirales, in the family Myoviridae. Bacteria serve as natural hosts, with transmission achieved through passive diffusion. There are eight species in this genus.

Taxonomy
The following species are recognized:
 Mycobacterium virus Alice
 Mycobacterium virus Bxz1
 Mycobacterium virus Dandelion
 Mycobacterium virus HyRo
 Mycobacterium virus I3
 Mycobacterium virus Lukilu
 Mycobacterium virus Nappy
 Mycobacterium virus Sebata

Structure
Bixzunaviruses are nonenveloped, with a head and tail. The head has a diameter between 75 and 95  nm, with a length of 80 nm. The tail is around 53 nm long.

Genome
The sequence for Mycobacterium virus I3 is not available from ICTV. Fifteen similar but unclassified viruses are available, ranging between 153k and 158k nucleotides, with 218 to 241 proteins. The complete genomes are available here.

Life cycle
The virus attaches to the host cell using its terminal fibers, and ejects the viral DNA into the host cytoplasm via contraction of its tail sheath. Viral replication is cytoplasmic. DNA-templated transcription is the method of transcription. Once the viral genes have been replicated, the procapsid is assembled and packed. The tail is then assembled and the mature virions are released via lysis. Bacteria serve as the natural host. Transmission route is passive diffusion.

History
According to the ICTV's 2009 report, the genus I3-like viruses was first accepted as a new genus, at the same time as its type species. In 2012, the name was changed to I3likevirus. The genus was later renamed to Bixzunavirus.

References

External links
 Viralzone: I3likevirus
 ICTV

Myoviridae
Virus genera